Booker is a hamlet within the parish of West Wycombe in Buckinghamshire, England, which has absorbed into the expanding suburbs of High Wycombe.  There are several housing areas in Booker, mainly modern estates. At the 2011 Census the hamlet was included in the High Wycombe Ward of Booker and Cressex.

Booker is also the name frequently given to the local airfield, more properly known as Wycombe Air Park, one of the busiest general aviation airfields in the South East of England.  The airfield is used for general aviation and gliding and is home to both helicopters and fixed wing planes.

The airfield is home to the Airways Flying Club and Wycombe Air Centre.

Main parts are mistaken for Cressex, the neighbouring village to the east of the hamlet.  This is because there are no proper, recognised borders between Booker, Cressex, Sands and Castlefield.

External links
Flying Families, GA Flying Organisation based at Booker
Wycombe Air Centre
British Airways Flying Club at Booker

Hamlets in Buckinghamshire
High Wycombe